The 1990 Vanderbilt Commodores football team represented Vanderbilt University in the 1990 NCAA Division I-A football season as a member of the Southeastern Conference (SEC). The Commodores were led by head coach Watson Brown in his fifth season and final season at his Alma mater. With a record of one win and ten losses (1–10 overall, 1–6 in the SEC).

This was Vanderbilt's 101st year of playing football. It took Vanderbilt 50 years to make it to the 100 loss mark, and in the next 50 years Vanderbilt, would lose another 300 football games. In Vanderbilt's 3rd game of the 1990 season they lost to Alabama for the school's 400th all time loss.

Schedule

Source: 1990 Vanderbilt football schedule

References

Vanderbilt
Vanderbilt Commodores football seasons
Vanderbilt Commodores football